Jim Whyte (born 29 September 1944) is a Scottish former footballer who played for Kilsyth Rangers, Aberdeen, Kilmarnock and Kirkintilloch Rob Roy, as a full back.

References

1944 births
Living people
Scottish footballers
Kilsyth Rangers F.C. players
Aberdeen F.C. players
Kilmarnock F.C. players
Kirkintilloch Rob Roy F.C. players
Scottish Football League players
Association football fullbacks
Scotland under-23 international footballers
People from Kilsyth
Footballers from North Lanarkshire